Willem Jacob van de Graaf (28 May 1736 or 1737, in Huissen – 10 December 1804, in Utrecht) was the 35th  Dutch Governor of Ceylon during the Dutch period in Ceylon. 

Willem Jacob was the third child of Sebastiaan van de Graaf, Major of Cavalry in the Army of the United Provinces, and Geertruid van Vinceler. At the age of 18, Van de Graaf left on the ship Blijdorp for Ceylon, where he became a merchant in Galle. There, in 1862, he married Agnita Clara Samlant (1745-1773), the daughter of the Commander of Galle and Mat. They had five children. In 1766 he became "head of the Mahabadde" in Colombo, the civil servant in charge of the economically important cinnamon cultivation. After the death of his first wife, he married Christina Elisabeth van Angelbeek (1756-1792), with whom he had 11 children, two sons and one daughter of which survived childhood.

He was appointed Governor of Ceylon on 7 February 1785 until he was requested in 1793 to become first Counsellor and Director-General of the Dutch Settlement in India (in Suratte). On 15 July 1794 he was succeeded as governor by his father-in-law, Johan van Angelbeek. He retired to the estate De Liesbosch south of the city Utrecht, where he died in 1804.

References

1730s births
1804 deaths
Year of birth uncertain
18th-century Dutch people
18th-century Dutch colonial governors
Governors of Dutch Ceylon
People from Lingewaard
Dutch East India Company people
Dutch India
Dutch expatriates in India